Marie Bruner Haines (November 16, 1885 - 1979)  was an American painter, illustrator, muralist, craftsman, lecturer and teacher.

Biography 
Marie Bruner Haines was born on November 16, 1885 in Cincinnati, Ohio to Charles Henry Haines and Olive C. Bruner.

Haines studied art at the Art Academy of Cincinnati from 1900-1901, at the Pennsylvania Academy of the Fine Arts, in Philadelphia from 1904-1905. She moved to Atlanta, Georgia before returning to studies in 1915 in New York at the Art Students League with Noble Volk, Francis Coates Jones , Frank DuMond, and Dimitri Romanofsky.

She was a member of the Southern States Art League and the Texas Fine Arts Association.  She was based in College Station, Texas for many years.

Haines died in 1979 in Bennington, Vermont.

Selected works
 Murals, Cushing Library, Texas A&M
 Gesso panels, Museum of New Mexico, Santa Fe, New Mexico
 Theater decorations, Bryan, Texas

References

1885 births
1979 deaths
20th-century American painters
American women painters
20th-century American women artists
Pennsylvania Academy of the Fine Arts alumni
Art Academy of Cincinnati alumni
Artists from Cincinnati